Park Hae-soo (born November 21, 1981) is a South Korean actor who is best known worldwide for portraying Cho Sang-woo in Squid Game (2021). He is also known for his starring roles in the television series Prison Playbook (2017–2018), and Money Heist: Korea (2022). He has also appeared in films such as By Quantum Physics: A Nightlife Venture (2019), Time to Hunt (2020), and Yaksha: Ruthless Operations (2022).

Career
Park made his theater debut in 2007 with Mr. Lobby. He also appeared in various musicals such as Hero and The Goddess is Watching. In 2012, Park made his first appearance on screen in the television series God of War.

In 2017, he gained his first leading role in the drama series Prison Playbook. He received positive reviews for his portrayal of a baseball player imprisoned for assault and it earned him Best New Actor at The Seoul Awards.

In 2021, Park gained international fame after playing Cho Sang-woo in the South Korean television series, Squid Game. After the success of Squid Game, Park (alongside his co-stars Lee Jung-jae and HoYeon Jung) gained an increase in Instagram followers, receiving over 800,000 followers in a single day. Later that year, Park was cast as Berlin in the Korean remake of Spanish crime drama Money Heist.

In July 2022, Park signed with the U.S. talent agency UTA. In Korea, he is contracted with BH Entertainment.

Personal life 
Park was in a relationship with musical actress Lim Kang-hee from 2013 to 2016.

On January 14, 2019, Park married in a private ceremony held in Seoul. On September 17, 2021, his wife had given birth to a son.

Filmography

Film

Television series

Web series

Web shows

Music video appearances

Theater

Discography

Audio books

Awards and nominations

References

External links
 
 
 

1981 births
Living people
People from Suwon
Dankook University alumni
South Korean male film actors
South Korean male stage actors
South Korean male musical theatre actors
South Korean male television actors
South Korean male web series actors
21st-century South Korean male actors
Best New Actor for Blue Dragon Film Award winners